The men's high jump at the 2008 Olympic Games took place on 17–19 August at the Beijing Olympic Stadium. Forty athletes from 28 nations competed. The event was won by Andrey Silnov of Russia, the nation's second victory (after 2000) in the men's high jump. Germaine Mason's silver was Great Britain's first medal in the event since 1996, and matched the nation's best-ever result. Silnov's countryman Yaroslav Rybakov won bronze, marking the first time since 1988 that a nation had two medalists in the men's high jump in the same Games. Reigning world champion Donald Thomas, who cleared 2.32 metres at Osaka 2007, finished in twenty-first place and failed to advance into the final round. For the first time (other than the boycotted 1980 Games), no American made the final.

Background

This was the 26th appearance of the event, which is one of 12 athletics events to have been held at every Summer Olympics. The returning finalists from the 2004 Games were gold medalist (and 2000 fourth-place finisher) Stefan Holm of Sweden, bronze medalist Jaroslav Bába of the Czech Republic, sixth-place finisher Yaroslav Rybakov and ninth-place finisher Vyacheslav Voronin of Russia (the latter of whom had also been a finalist in 2000), tenth-place finisher Dragutin Topić of Serbia (now in his fifth Games under his fourth flag: Independent Olympic Participant in 1992, Yugoslavia in 1996 and 2000, Serbia and Montenegro in 2004), and twelfth-place finisher Alessandro Talotti of Italy.

Antigua and Barbuda, Botswana, Mexico, Serbia, and Slovakia each made their debut in the event. The United States made its 25th appearance, most of any nation, having missed only the boycotted 1980 Games.

Qualification

The qualifying standards were 2.30 m (7.55 ft) (A standard) and 2.27 m (7.45 ft) (B standard). Each National Olympic Committee (NOC) was able to enter up to three entrants providing they had met the A standard in the qualifying period (1 January 2007 to 23 July 2008). NOCs were also permitted to enter one athlete providing he had met the B standard in the same qualifying period. The maximum number of athletes per nation had been set at 3 since the 1930 Olympic Congress.

Competition format

The competition used the two-round format introduced in 1912. There were two distinct rounds of jumping with results cleared between rounds. Jumpers were eliminated if they had three consecutive failures, whether at a single height or between multiple heights if they attempted to advance before clearing a height.

The qualifying round had the bar set at 2.10 metres, 2.15 metres, 2.20 metres, 2.25 metres, and 2.29 metres. All jumpers clearing 2.29 metres in the qualifying round advanced to the final. If fewer than 12 jumpers could achieve it, the top 12 (including ties, though for the first time the countback rules would be applied to narrow the ties) would advance to the final.

The final had jumps at 2.15 metres, 2.20 metres, 2.25 metres, 2.29 metres, 2.32 metres, 2.34 metres, and 2.36 metres; the winner also took attempts at 2.42 metres.

Records

Prior to this competition, the existing world and Olympic records were as follows.

No new world or Olympic records were set for this event.

Schedule

All times are China Standard Time (UTC+8)

Results

Qualifying round

Qualification Criteria:	Qualifying Performance 2.32 (Q) or at least 12 best performers (q) advance to the final. Because only 8 jumpers cleared 2.29 metres, nobody took any attempts at 2.32 metres. In prior Games, the top 12 including all ties for a given height would advance; this time, the countback rules applied and only some of the jumpers clearing 2.25 metres advanced. The qualification rule, in effect, became "cleared 2.29 metres, or cleared 2.25 metres on the first attempt with no more than one miss before that." Thus, Parson—who cleared 2.25 metres on the first attempt and had one miss at 2.20 metres—advanced in 12th place while Manson—who also cleared 2.25 metres on the first attempt and had one miss at 2.20 metres, but had also had a miss at 2.15 metres—was eliminated in 13th place. (The prior rules would have led to a 20-man final in Beijing.)

Final

The final was held on August 19.

References

Athletics at the 2008 Summer Olympics
High jump at the Olympics
Men's events at the 2008 Summer Olympics